Seinonella peptonophila  is a bacterium from the genus of Seinonella which has been isolated from soil in Japan.

References

Further reading

External links
Type strain of Seinonella peptonophila at BacDive -  the Bacterial Diversity Metadatabase	

Bacillales
Bacteria described in 1971